Kanze Dena Mararo, also known as Kellen Beatrice Kanze Dena Mararo, is a Swahili Kenyan journalist who is the current spokesperson in the executive office of the president of the Republic of Kenya and Head of President's Strategic Communication Unit (PSCU). She previously worked as a news anchor who reported on current affairs, political interviews and entertainment. Dena has worked as a news anchor for other networks, including Kenya Broadcasting Corporation, Kenya Television Network, and Citizen TV. She resigned from Citizen TV in June 2018, after being appointed as the Deputy State House Spokesperson and Deputy Head of  PSCU, before ascending to her current role of Spokesperson in the Executive Office of the President.

Early life and education 
Dena was born to parents of Duruma ancestry, who are a part of the Mijikenda community. They initially resided in Mazeras in Kwale. She grew up in various parts of Kenya, including Kwale and Nairobi. She went to Kianjokoma Primary School (today known as the St. Matthews Mixed Boarding Primary School in Embu) as well as Kieni Girls High School for secondary education (O-levels). She graduated in 1997. She intended to join the Kenya Medical Training College, but after several unsuccessful application attempts, she resorted to studying Journalism and Mass Communication at Foundation College of Professional Studies.

Career 
Dena enrolled for a Journalism communications course at Foundation College of Professional Studies. She interned for Kenya Broadcasting Corporation (KBC) radio station as a Swahili news reader. She was later employed at the KBC TV as a news anchor, alongside co-anchor Badi Muhsin. After six years at KBC, she crossed over to Citizen TV, where she became a household name in the Kenyan media. At Citizen TV, she was paired with Lulu Hassan, whom she anchored the news on Nipashe Wikendi with for almost six years.

Dena served as a Deputy State House Spokesperson and Deputy Head of PSCU in charge of coordinating digital, messaging, research, branding and press at State House, in an effort of the Uhuru Kenyatta pushing the Big Four agenda and legacy building.

She currently serves as the spokesperson in the Executive Office of the President and head of the President's Strategic Communication Unit (PSCU).

References 

Living people
Kenyan television journalists
Kenyan women television journalists
Kenyan women radio journalists
Kenyan radio journalists
Kenyan radio presenters
Kenyan women radio presenters
Kenyan television presenters
Kenyan women television presenters
Year of birth missing (living people)